Bluestem State Recreation Area (SRA) is a state park in southeastern Nebraska, United States. The recreation area is managed by the Nebraska Game and Parks Commission. The area is popular for boating, fishing, camping, and swimming. The reservoir is stocked with largemouth bass, bluegill, channel catfish, walleye and crappies. There are 19 primitive campsites.

See also
Salt Valley Lakes

References

External links
 Bluestem State Recreation Area
 Nebraska Game and Parks Commission

Protected areas of Lancaster County, Nebraska
State parks of Nebraska